The Chiuni is a coastal river in the west of the department of Corse-du-Sud, Corsica, France.

Course

It crosses the communes of Cargèse, Marignana and Piana.
The Chiuni rises in the commune of Marignana  to the west of the  Capu a é Macenule.
It flows in a generally east-southeast direction to enter the sea in the Golfe de Chiuni.
There is a beach, the Plage de Chiuni, at the mouth of the river.
From the beach there is a view of Capu d'Orchinu and its Genoese tower, the Torra d'Orchinu.

Tributaries

The following streams (ruisseaux) are tributaries of the Chiuni (ordered by length) and sub-tributaries:

 Fornellu: 
 Forcu a e Teghie: 
 Ruscia: 
 Malo: 
 Chesaccia: 
 Aculone: 
 Pascianu: 
 Persicu: 
 Truscielli: 
 Milari: 
 Ambione: 
 Cario: 
 Finucchiaghia:

Notes

Sources

Rivers of Corse-du-Sud
Rivers of France
Coastal basins of the Mediterranean Sea in Corsica